Seppo Pelkonen (13 April 1930 – 11 September 2008) was a Finnish footballer. He played in 16 matches for the Finland national football team from 1951 to 1955. He was also part of Finland's team at the 1952 Summer Olympics, and for their qualification matches for the 1954 FIFA World Cup.

References

External links
 

1930 births
2008 deaths
Finnish footballers
Finland international footballers
Place of birth missing
Association football midfielders
Kuopion Palloseura players